The Chancellor of Justice is a Finnish government official who supervises authorities', such as cabinet ministers', compliance with the law and advances legal protection of Finnish citizens. The Chancellor investigates complaints against authorities' activities and may also start an investigation of his or her own initiative. The Chancellor attends cabinet meetings to ensure that legal procedures and regulations are followed. The Chancellor has wide-ranging oversight, investigative and prosecutorial powers.

The Chancellor and his deputy are appointed by the President of Finland. The Chancellor is appointed for life.

The incumbent Chancellor of Justice is Tuomas Pöysti.

History
The Office of the Chancellor of Justice dates back to the 18th century, when Finland was part of the Kingdom of Sweden. When Finland was annexed by the Russian Empire in 1809 as an autonomous Grand Duchy, the legal system largely remained the same. The duties of the Chancellor of Justice were given to the Procurator, who assisted the Governor-General in supervising obedience of the law.

A year after Finland had declared its independence in 1917, the title was reverted to Chancellor of Justice. The first Chancellor of Justice was Pehr Evind Svinhufvud, who had served as the Speaker of the Parliament and who was later to become the third President of Finland. In 1919, the post of Parliamentary Ombudsman was created. The Ombudsman and the Chancellor of Justice share many duties.

Duties

 supervising the lawfulness of the official acts of the Government and the President of the Republic
 providing the President, the Government and the Ministries with information and opinions on legal issues
 supervising that the courts of law, other authorities and civil servants, public employees and other persons obey the law and fulfill their obligations when performing public tasks
 monitoring the implementation of basic rights and liberties and human rights
 supervising the conduct of advocates with the Finnish Bar Association

List of Chancellor of Justice

See also
 Judicial system of Finland
 Government of Finland
 Chancellor of Justice
 Ombudsman

References

External links
 

Law of Finland
.
Government agencies of Finland
Region-specific legal occupations